Maglica is a surname. Notable people with the surname include:

Anthony Maglica (born 1930), American businessman
Anton Maglica (born 1991), Bosnian-born Croatian footballer
Nikica Maglica (born 1965), Croatian footballer and manager

Croatian surnames